Mark David Reynolds (born 1 January 1966) is an English former professional footballer who played in the Football League for Mansfield Town.

References

1966 births
Living people
English footballers
Association football defenders
English Football League players
Mansfield Town F.C. players
Buxton F.C. players